Bill McIntyre (born July 9, 1964 in Toronto, Ontario) was a wide receiver who was a 5th round draft pick (45th overall) to the Hamilton Tiger-Cats in 1987.  He had jersey number 10.

McIntyre played college football from 1983 to 1987 at St. Francis Xavier University, where he set a Canadian Interuniversity Athletics Union (now known as Canadian Interuniversity Sports) record with his 155th inter-collegiate reception.  He finished his career with 163 receptions.  McIntyre still holds the record for all-time leader in receptions and yards in St. Francis Xavier history.

Bill McIntyre was inducted into the St. Francis Xavier Sports Hall of Fame on October 9, 2014.

References

1964 births
Living people
St. Francis Xavier University alumni
Canadian football people from Toronto